Ono is the main village and capital of the Alo District on the southern coast of Futuna Island. Its population according to the 2018 census was 524 people.

References

Populated places in Wallis and Futuna